Alberto Miguel Martín (born May 29, 1977) is a Spanish professional basketball player.

Player career 
1995/96  CB Laredo (youth team)
1996/99  CB Calasanz Santander
1999/03  Cantabria Lobos
2003/06  Llanera Menorca
2006/09  Plus Pujol Lleida
2009/11  Ford Burgos
2011/12  CD Estela
2012/12  Aguas de Sousas Ourense
2012/  Ford Burgos

Honours
Plus Pujol Lleida

LEB Catalan League Champion: 2
2007, 2008

External links
Official CB Lleida website
Alberto Miguel profile
CB Laredo (Spanish)
Summer basketball campus Alberto Miguel (Spanish)

1977 births
Living people
Basketball players from Cantabria
Liga ACB players
Menorca Bàsquet players
People from Laredo, Cantabria
Point guards
Spanish men's basketball players
Club Ourense Baloncesto players